Telectadium is a genus of flowering plants belonging to the family Apocynaceae.

Its native range is Indo-China.

Species:

Telectadium dongnaiense 
Telectadium edule 
Telectadium linearicarpum

References

Apocynaceae
Apocynaceae genera